Gastón Alberto Togni (born 20 September 1997) is an Argentine professional footballer who plays as a left winger for Defensa y Justicia.

Career

Club
Togni's professional footballing career started with Argentine Primera División side Independiente in March 2017, he made his senior debut in a goalless draw at home to San Martín on 18 March. Seven more league appearances followed for Togni during 2016–17. Togni was loaned by Defensa y Justicia on 5 July 2018.

International
Togni was selected to train with the Argentina U20s ahead of the 2017 FIFA U-20 World Cup in South Korea, but he wasn't selected for the final squad. He did make his debut for the U20s in that period though, featuring in a friendly with Uruguay on 22 March 2017.

Career statistics
.

Honours
Independiente
Copa Sudamericana: 2017
Argentina U23
Pre-Olympic Tournament: 2020

References

External links

1997 births
Living people
Sportspeople from Buenos Aires Province
Argentine people of Italian descent
Argentine footballers
Argentina youth international footballers
Argentina under-20 international footballers
Association football wingers
Argentine Primera División players
Club Atlético Independiente footballers
Defensa y Justicia footballers